Susie was an Australian morning talk and variety show, produced by WIN Television and hosted by Susie Elelman in Wollongong, New South Wales.

It was also broadcast on two Nine Network affiliate stations, NWS-9 Adelaide and STW-9 Perth which were both owned by the WIN Corporation. In these two cities, the show remains at 12 noon. The show was axed at 20 June 2008, with affiliate Nine clearing some space for 3 stages with the Nine News major expansion.

On 16 August 2007 as part of several changes to WIN's daytime television schedule, Susie was also at  timeslot.

Segments
Susie featured several regular guests, whilst including experts in the fields of health, family, career, cooking, relationships, beauty and fashion. Helen Hope specialised in astrology, Dr. Rob Zammit focused on pet advice, Georgina Walker featured in segments using psychic powers, Adam Richards was the program's gardener and featured in gardening segments, whilst Janie Larmour was the fitness expert.

Regulars
 Adam Richards
 Claudia Keeche
 Dr. David Knight
 Georgina Walker
 Helen Hope
 Janie Larmour
 Dr. Jenny Smiley
 Dr. Rob Zammit
 Shelley-Taylor Smith
 Karan Hayes
 Dr. Suzy Green
 Victoria Hanson
 Sherryl McFarlane
 Nicole Bell

See also
 List of Australian television series

References

External links 
 

WIN Television original programming
Australian television talk shows
Australian variety television shows
Television shows set in New South Wales
2007 Australian television series debuts
2008 Australian television series endings